Manzonia vigoensis is a species of minute sea snail, a marine gastropod mollusk or micromollusk in the family Rissoidae.

Description
Manzonia vigoensis has a shell size up to 1.6 mm. It is found in the Bay of Biscay and the coast of Portugal and Galicia.

Distribution

References

vigoensis
Molluscs of the Atlantic Ocean
Molluscs of Europe
Gastropods described in 1983